Traoré or Traore is a surname of Manding origin, as written in French orthography, which is common in Mali, Senegal, Burkina Faso, Ivory Coast and Guinea. In anglophone West Africa the name is often spelled Trawally.

Notable people with the surname include

A
Abd Traore, Guinean entrepreneur
Abdou Traoré (disambiguation), multiple people
Abdoulaye Traoré (disambiguation), multiple people
Abdoullaye Traoré (born 2000), Ivorian-Italian footballer
Abibatou Traoré (born 1973), Senegalese writer
Abou Traoré, Guinean politician
Aboubacar Traoré (born 1992), Burkinabé footballer
Adama Traoré (disambiguation), multiple people
Aissata Traoré (born 1997), Malian footballer
Alain Traoré (born 1988), Burkinabé footballer
Ali Traoré (born 1985), French basketball player
Aliou Traoré (born 2001), French footballer
Alou Traoré (born 1974), Malian footballer
Alyssa Traoré (born 1998), Dutch fashion model
Amadou Traoré (born 2002), French footballer
Amara Traoré (born 1965), Senegalese footballer
Aminata Traoré (born 1947), Malian politician
Aminata Traoré (taekwondo) (born 1999), Ivorian taekwondo practitioner
Apolline Traoré (born 1976), Burkinabé filmmaker
Arissou Traore (born 1984), Togolese footballer
Armand Traoré (born 1989), French footballer
Assa Traoré (born 1985), French activist
Astou Traoré (born 1981), Senegalese basketball player
Awa Traoré (disambiguation), multiple people
Aya Traoré (born 1983), Senegalese basketball player
Ayouba Traoré (born 1982), Malian judoka

B
Baba Traoré (born 1992), French footballer
Babemba Traoré (1855–1898), Malian royal
Baboye Traoré (born 1990), French footballer
Badara Traore (born 1997), American football player
Bakaye Traoré (born 1985), Malian footballer
Bano Traoré (born 1985), Malian-French athlete
Ben Traoré (born 1986), Malian footballer
Bénie Traoré (born 2002), Ivorian footballer
Bertrand Traoré (born 1995), Burkinabé footballer
Bio Aï Traoré (born 1985), Beninese footballer
Boubacar Traoré (disambiguation), multiple people
Brahim Traoré (born 2004), French footballer
Brahima Traoré (born 1974), Burkinabé footballer
Bréhima Traoré (born 1973), Malian footballer

C
Chaka Traore (born 2004), Ivorian footballer
Charles Traoré (born 1992), Malian footballer
Cheibane Traoré (born 1990), Malian footballer
Cheick Traoré (born 1995), Malian footballer
Cheick Bougadary Traoré, Malian political candidate
Cherif Traoré (born 1994), Guinean-Italian footballer
Christian Traoré (born 1982), Danish footballer

D
Dambou Traoré (born 1977), French footballer
Dame Traoré (born 1986), French footballer
Demba Traoré (born 1982), Swedish footballer
Demba Traoré (politician) (born 1972), Malian lawyer and politician
Diarra Traoré (1935–1985), Guinean politician
Diedie Traore (born 1999), French footballer
Dioncounda Traoré (born 1942), Malian politician
Diongolo Traore (1914–1971), Burkinabé politician
Djémoussa Traoré (born 2000), Malian footballer
Djiguible Traoré (born 1960), Malian boxer
Djimi Traoré (born 1980), Malian footballer
Dramane Traoré (born 1982), Malian footballer
Drissa Traoré (born 1992), Ivorian footballer

E
Efua Traoré, Nigerian-German writer
Elhadj Oumar Traoré, Guinean politician
Eric Traoré (born 1996), Burkinabé footballer

F
Falaba Issa Traoré (1930–2003), Malian writer
Fodie Traore (born 1985), French footballer

G
Gaoussou Traoré (born 1999), French footballer

H
Hadamou Traoré (born 1993), French footballer
Hamari Traoré (born 1992), Malian footballer
Hamed Traorè (born 2000), Ivorian footballer
Hamidou Traoré (born 1996), Malian footballer
Henri Traoré (born 1983), Burkinabé footballer
Honoré Traoré (born 1957), Burkinabé soldier

I
Ibrahim Traoré (born 1988), Burkinabé military officer
Ibrahim Traoré (footballer) (born 1988), Ivorian footballer
Ibrahima Traoré (born 1988), Guinean footballer
Idrissa Traoré (disambiguation), multiple people
Ismaël Traoré (born 1986), French/Ivorian footballer
Issa Traoré (born 1979), Malian footballer
Iya Traoré (born 1986), Guinean footballer

J
Jean-Victor Traoré (born 1985), Burkinabé basketball player

K
Kady Traoré (born 1979), Burkinabé actress
Kalifa Traoré (born 1991), Malian footballer
Kalilou Traoré (born 1987), Malian footballer
Kandia Traoré (born 1980), Ivorian footballer
Kassim Traoré (born 1966), Malian boxer
Koh Traoré (born 1989), Burkinabé-Ivorian footballer

L
Lacina Traoré (born 1990), Ivorian footballer
Lamine Traoré (disambiguation), multiple people
Lassana Traoré (born 1945), Malian politician and diplomat
Lassina Traoré (born 2001), Burkinabé footballer
Lobi Traoré (1961–2010), Malian musician

M
Madimoussa Traoré (born 1986), French footballer
Mahama Johnson Traoré (1942–2010), Senegalese film director
Mahamadou Traoré (born 1994), Malian footballer
Mahamane Traoré (born 1988), Malian footballer
Mai Traore (born 1999), Guinean footballer
Maïlys Traoré (born 1995), French rugby union footballer
Maimouna Traoré (born 1998), Malian footballer
Makan Traore (footballer, born 1992) (born 1992), French footballer 
Mamadou Traoré (disambiguation), multiple people
Mamary Traoré (born 1980), Malian footballer
Mariam Traore (born 1980), Ivorian handball player
Mathieu Traoré (born 1972), Burkinabé footballer
Mélégué Maurice Traoré (born 1951), Burkinabé politician
Mody Traoré (born 1980), French footballer
Moha Traoré (born 1994), Malian-Spanish footballer
Mohamed Traoré (disambiguation), multiple people
Mouhamadou Traoré (born 1982/1986), Senegalese footballer
Mouna Traoré, Canadian actress
Moussa Traoré (disambiguation), multiple people
Mustapha Traoré (born 1982), French footballer

N
Nassira Traoré (born 1988), Malian volleyball player

O
Oula Abass Traoré (born 1995), Burkinabé footballer
Omar Haktab Traoré (born 1998), German footballer
Oumar Traoré (disambiguation), multiple people
Oumou Traoré (born 1969), Malian athlete
Ousmane Traoré (born 1977), Burkinabé footballer
Ousmane Traoré (footballer, born 1985) (born 1985), Senegalese footballer

P
Pon-Karidjatou Traoré (born 1986), Burkinabé athlete

R
Rokia Traoré (born 1974), Malian singer–songwriter

S
Sa Brahima Traore (born 1982), Burkinabé footballer
Safradine Traoré (born 1986), Beninese footballer
Salif Traoré (born 1972), Malian politician
Salimata Traoré (born 1994), Malian politician
Saloum Traoré, Nigerien politician
Sambou Traoré (born 1979), Malian basketball player
Sammy Traoré (born 1976), Malian footballer
Saratou Traoré (born 2002), Malian footballer
Sékou Traoré born 1962, Burkinabé filmmaker
Seydou Traoré (born 1970), Burkinabé footballer
Souleymane Traore (1987–2009), Guinean footballer
Soumaila Traoré (born 1973), Malian footballer

T
Tiécoura Traoré, Malian actor
Tieba Traoré (1845–1893), Malian royal
Tiramakhan Traore, Malian general
Togba Traoré, Guinean politician

Y
Yohan Traore (born 2003), French basketball player
Youssouf Traoré (born 1991), Ivorian footballer

 
Surnames of Burkinabé origin